Lowell is a surname, see "Lowell family" for name origin. Notable people with the surname include:

 The Lowell family, a prominent family name in England and America
 Abbe Lowell (born 1952), American defense attorney
 ella morgan Lowell (1856–1943), lawyer, historian, philanthropist, and former President of Harvard University
 Amy Lowell (1874–1925), poet, critic, publisher, and sister of Abbott Lawrence and Percival Lowell
 Andrea Lowell (born 1983), actress and model
 Anna Cabot Lowell (1819–1874), American writer
 Augustus Lowell (1830–1900), businessman, philanthropist, and father of Percival, Abbott Lawrence, and Amy Lowell
 Carey Lowell (born 1961), actress and wife of actor Richard Gere
 Catelynn Lowell (Catelynn Baltierra; born 1992), American reality television personality, author, and public speaker
 Charles Russell Lowell, Sr. (1782–1861), Unitarian pastor, son of The Old Judge, father of James Russell, and great-great grandfather of Robert Lowell
 Charles Russell Lowell (1835–1864), Union General and American Civil War hero
 Charlie Lowell (born 1973), keyboardist for Jars of Clay
 Chipper Lowell, American comedian
 Chris Lowell (born 1984), actor
 Christopher Lowell (Richard Lowell Madden; born 1955), interior decorator and television personality
 Delmar R. Lowell (1844–1912), pastor, Civil War veteran, and genealogist
 Edward Jackson Lowell (1845–1894), author and father of Guy Lowell
 Eric Lowell (born 1935), English footballer
 Frances Lowell (1886 – not earlier than 1952), American educational psychologist
 Francis Cabot Lowell (businessman) (1775–1817), businessman and namesake of Lowell, Massachusetts
 Francis Cabot Lowell (judge) (1855–1911), United States Congressman and Federal Judge
 Guy Lowell (1870–1927), architect and landscape designer
 Harry Lowell (born 1971), American television and feature film producer
 Helen Lowell (Helen Lowell Robb; 1866–1937), American stage and film actress
 James A. Lowell (1849–1900), Canadian merchant and politician
 James Arnold Lowell (1869–1933), American jurist
 James Russell Lowell (1819–1891), American poet and politician
 Joan Lowell (1902–1967), actress and newspaper reporter
 John Lowell (1743–1802), aka The Old Judge, United States Federal Judge appointed by President George Washington
 John Lowell, Jr. (lawyer) (1769–1840), aka The Boston Rebel, Federalist lawyer and son of The Old Judge
 John Lowell, Jr. (philanthropist) (1799–1836), son of Industrialist Francis Cabot Lowell and founder of the Lowell Institute
 John Amory Lowell (1798–1881), businessman and philanthropist
 John Lowell (judge) (1824–1897), United States Federal judge and son of John Amory Lowell 
 Josephine Shaw Lowell (1843–1905), sister of American Civil War hero Robert Gould Shaw, first woman to hold a public office in New York City, and wife of Gen. Charles Russell Lowell
 Joshua A. Lowell (1801–1874), United States Representative from Maine (1839–1843)
 Maria White Lowell (1821–1853), poet, abolitionist, and wife of James Russell Lowell
 Mike Lowell (born 1974), baseball player for the Boston Red Sox
 Nathan Lowell (born 1952), American science fiction writer 
 Norman Lowell (born 1946), founder of the extreme-right Maltese political party, Imperium Europa
 Orson Lowell (1871–1956), American artist and illustrator
 Percival Lowell (1855–1916), author, astronomer, founder of Lowell Observatory, and brother of Amy and Abbott Lawrence Lowell
 Ralph Lowell (1890–1978), businessman, philanthropist, and founding force behind Boston's WGBH public television
 Robert Lowell (1917–1977), poet and lecturer
 Rupe Lowell (1893–1980), Australian rules footballer
 Scott Lowell (born 1965), actor
 Spencer Lowell (born 1983), American photographer
 Tom Lowell (born 1941), American film and television actor
 Waverly Lowell, American archivist
 William Lowell Sr. (1863–1954), American dentist, inventor of a wooden golf tee
 William Lowell Jr. (1897–1976), manufacturer of golf tees and industrial packaging specialist

Fictional characters:
 Carmen Lowell, main character in the book and film The Sisterhood of the Traveling Pants
 Christopher Lowell, stage name for Richard Lowell Madden, interior designer and TV host
 Elizabeth Lowell, pen name for Ann Maxwell, popular romance writer
 Ellen Lowell, fictional character from the American daytime soap opera As the World Turns
 Yuri Lowell, main character in the game Tales of Vesperia